Mitchell Fjord is a 30- to 50-km long fjord in Aysén Region, Chile, stretching southeast from the vicinities of Baker Channel into the valley of Bravo River. Through a ferry based on Puerto Yungay, the channel provides access to the southernmost portion of Carretera Austral and constitutes thus the only discontinuous section of Carretera Austral south of Chaitén.

Tributaries 
The fjord receives the waters of the Baker Channel.

References 

Fjords of Chile
Landforms of Aysén Region